The Vava'u rail (Hypotaenidia vavauensis) is an extinct species of bird in Rallidae.  It was first described in 1793 from an illustration. In 2020 subfossil remains were found on the island of Vuna, in the Vava'u island group of Tonga.

Description
The Vava'u rail was a flightless bird with legs longer and bulkier than most known species in Hypotaenidia. The bill was blood red becoming more of a pale pink towards the lip. The body had patches of grey and white appearing as a slaty blue. It was likely closely related, and visually similar to the ʻEua rail.

References

Rallidae
Extinct flightless birds
Bird extinctions since 1500
Birds described in 1793
Birds described in 2020
Taxobox binomials not recognized by IUCN